Kumbari dan Sharefa (reigned 1731–1743) was a Hausa King (Sarkin) of Kano. He succeeded Mohammed Sharef and is remembered for his high taxation on the Kurmi Market.

References

People from Kano
18th-century monarchs in Africa
Hausa people